The northern spotted rock dtella (Gehyra nana) is a species of gecko endemic to Australia.

References

Gehyra
Reptiles described in 1978
Geckos of Australia